Lennox Alleyne (born 1 July 1985), better known as Lennox Allen, is a Guyanese professional boxer who challenged for the WBA interim super-middleweight title in 2020.

Professional career
Allen made his professional debut on 16 April 2004, scoring a second-round technical knockout (TKO) victory against Troy Lewis at the Cliff Anderson Sports Hall in Georgetown, Guyana.

After compiling a record of 9–0 (5 KOs) he faced Leon Gilkes for the Guyanese super-middleweight title on 27 June 2009 at the Cliff Anderson Sports Hall. Allen dropped his opponent to the canvas in the first round with a left hand but was unable to capitalise on the success, allowing Gilkes to make it through the remainder of the round. 30 seconds into the second round, Allen landed another left hand to put Gilkes down for the second and final time. Gilkes was unable to recover in time, prompting the referee to call a halt to the contest, awarding Allen the Guyanese title via second-round TKO.

After two more wins in non-title fights – a six-round unanimous decision (UD) against Amador Acevedo in March 2010 followed by a sixth-round TKO against Victor Paz in July – he faced Darnell Boone on 7 August at the Aviator Sports and Events Center in New York City, fighting to a majority draw over eight rounds.

His next fight came against Nick Brinson for the vacant New York State super-middleweight title on 13 November 2010 at the Washington Avenue Armory in Albany, New York. Allen captured his captured his second professional title, defeating Brinson via seventh-round TKO.

After scoring another nine wins, six by stoppage, he faced rising prospect David Morrell (2–0, 2 KOs) for the vacant WBA interim super-middleweight title on 8 August 2020 at the Microsoft Theater in Los Angeles, California. Lennox suffered the first defeat of his career, losing by a wide UD with the judges' scorecards reading 118–110, 119–109, and 120–108.

Professional boxing record

References

External links

Living people
1985 births
Sportspeople from Georgetown, Guyana
Guyanese male boxers
Super-middleweight boxers
Southpaw boxers